Daniel Lascelles (6 November 1655 – 5 September 1734), English landowner and politician of Stank and Northallerton, North Riding, Yorkshire, was elected to the House of Commons as Member of Parliament for Northallerton at a by-election on 3 February 1702. He did not stand for election again. He also served as High Sheriff of Yorkshire in 1718–19.

Lascelles was the son of Francis Lascelles (1612–1667) of Stank Hall Kirby Sigston Yorkshire and his wife Frances, daughter of Sir William St Quintin (1579–1649), Baronet of Harpham Yorkshire. Francis Lascelles, regicide (for which he was granted indemnity) and a dissenter had been a colonel in the Parliament's army and was MP for the North Riding in 1653. Francis's trade connections extended to Ireland and Barbados.

Daniel Lascelles married twice.
By his first wife Margaret Metcalfe (died 1690) daughter and heiress of William Metcalfe of Northallerton, his nine children included:
 George Lascelles (1681–1729) a Barbados merchant, who died at his home in Fenchurch Street, London, on 12 February 1729.
 Henry Lascelles (1690–1753)
By his second wife Mary Lascelles (1662–1734): daughter of kinsman Edward Lascelles, merchant of Barbados and Stoke Newington London:
 Edward Lascelles (1702–1747), father of Edward Lascelles, 1st Earl of Harewood
 Francis Lascelles, died young

References

 Eveline Cruickshanks and Ivar McGrath, The History of Parliament Online - 1690-1715, 2002
 Simon David Smith, Slavery, family, and gentry capitalism in the British Atlantic, the world of the Lascelles 1648-1834, Cambridge 2006

1655 births
1734 deaths
English MPs 1701–1702
High Sheriffs of Yorkshire
People from Northallerton
Daniel